The Christmas Collection is the second studio album by the classical crossover vocal group Il Divo.  The album is a collection of Christmas or holiday-inspired songs.  It was released on 25 October 2005 in seven countries: the United States, Canada, Austria, Slovenia, the Netherlands, Sweden and Finland.

The Christmas Collection was also the best-selling holiday album of 2005 in the United States according to sales figures from Nielsen/SoundScan, with total sales of 544,000 copies that year.

On 8 January 2007, The Christmas Collection was certified Platinum by the Recording Industry Association of America for shipments of one million copies in the United States.

Track listing
 "O Holy Night"
 "White Christmas"
 "Ave Maria"
 "When a Child Is Born"
 "Adeste Fideles (O Come All Ye Faithful)"
 "Over the Rainbow"
 "Panis Angelicus"
 "Rejoice"
 "Silent Night"
 "The Lord's Prayer"

Charts

Weekly charts

Year-end charts

Certifications

See also
 List of Billboard Top Holiday Albums number ones of the 2000s

References

Il Divo albums
Syco Music albums
2005 Christmas albums
Pop Christmas albums
Classical Christmas albums
Columbia Records Christmas albums

hu:The Christmas Collection